is a Japanese former racing driver. After competing in the Auto GP series with Euronova Racing, he retired from motor racing and returned to Japan to work for S Medical, a business owned by his father.

Racing record

Complete Auto GP results
(key) (Races in bold indicate pole position) (Races in italics indicate fastest lap)

References

External links
 

1987 births
Living people
Sportspeople from Yamagata Prefecture
Japanese racing drivers
Formula BMW ADAC drivers
Asian Formula Renault Challenge drivers
Japanese Formula 3 Championship drivers
Formula Abarth drivers
Italian Formula Three Championship drivers
Auto GP drivers
Super GT drivers
KCMG drivers
Euronova Racing drivers
Mücke Motorsport drivers
Fortec Motorsport drivers